Divided Ground: Middle East Conflict 1948–1973 is a 2001 computer wargame developed by TalonSoft and published by Take-Two Interactive. It is part of the Campaign series, and follows Rising Sun.

Gameplay
Divided Ground is a computer wargame that simulates Arab–Israeli military conflict between the foundation of Israel in 1948 through the Yom Kippur War in 1973.

Development
Divided Ground was developed by TalonSoft as an entry in its Campaign series, which had previously included titles such as East Front and Rising Sun. It reuses the game engine from earlier titles in the series. The game was first announced under the title Arab-Israeli Wars in March 2001. Divided Ground was shipped to retailers on July 31.

Reception

Divided Ground received a negative review from Computer Gaming Worlds Bruce Geryk, who argued that its "scenario design is quite possibly the worst of any recent computer game." In a middling review, Tom Chick of GameSpot wrote, "The Campaign engine has been around far too long to be simply rehashed with so few changes."

References

External links
Official page (archived)

2001 video games
Computer wargames
Mass media about the Arab–Israeli conflict
Turn-based strategy video games
Windows games
Windows-only games
Video games developed in the United States
Video games set in Israel
TalonSoft games
Multiplayer and single-player video games
Take-Two Interactive games